Berosus may refer to:
In Greek mythology:
Berosus, father of Tanais by Lysippe (Amazon)
Berosus, father of the Sibyl Sabbe by Erymanthe
Berossus (3rd century BC), Hellenistic-era Babylonian writer and astronomer
Berosus (beetle), a genus of beetles of the family Hydrophilidae
Berosus (crater), a lunar crater